Dmitriyevo is a rural locality (a village) in Novoselskoye Rural Settlement, Kovrovsky District, Vladimir Oblast, Russia. The population was 100 as of 2010.

Geography 
Dmitriyevo is located 57 km southwest of Kovrov (the district's administrative centre) by road. Sazhino is the nearest rural locality.

References 

Rural localities in Kovrovsky District